Thomas Glenn may refer to:

Thomas G. Glenn, Canadian opera singer
Thomas L. Glenn (1847–1918), American politician
Thomas Glenn (pioneer), pioneer in the Western Virginia and Kentucky territories

See also
Thomas Glen (1796–1887), Scottish-Canadian politician and merchant
John Thomas Glenn (1845–1899), mayor of Atlanta
Thomas Glen-Coats (disambiguation)
Glenn Thomas (disambiguation)